Owzan Bolagh (also Romanized as Owzān Bolāgh; also known as Owzūn Bolāgh and Ūzūn Bolāgh) is a village in Mehmandust Rural District, Kuraim District, Nir County, Ardabil Province, Iran. At the 2006 census, its population was 117, in 25 families.

References 

Towns and villages in Nir County